The EDP Peştera Wind Farm is located in Peștera a commune in the Constanța County of Romania. Costing €200 million, the wind farm consists of 30 three-bladed Danish wind turbines, each capable of generating 3 megawatts (MW) of power, giving a total output of 90 MW.

The wind farm is owned by EDP Renováveis, the renewable energy branch of the Portuguese conglomerate Energias de Portugal.

References

Wind farms in Romania